Rajgarh (राजगढ़) Vidhan Sabha seat was one of the seats in Rajasthan Legislative Assembly in India. It became defunct in 2008 when electoral map of India was redrawn.

Members of Vidhan Sabha
 1962 : Hari Kishan (INC) 
 2003 : Samarth Lal (BJP)
 2008 onwards : Seat does not exist. See : Rajgarh Laxmangarh (Vidhan Sabha constituency)

Election Results

1962 Vidhan Sabha
 Hari Kishan (INC) : 14,124 votes 
 Bharat Lal (IND) : 12,836

2003 Vidhan Sabha
 Samarth Lal (BJP) : 36,903 votes  
 Johri Lal (INC) : 28,224

See also
 Rajgarh (disambiguation)
 Rajgarh District (राजगढ़ / राजगढ)
 Rajgarh, Madhya Pradesh
 Rajgarh, Rajasthan

References

Former assembly constituencies of Rajasthan
Alwar district
Constituencies disestablished in 2008
Constituencies established in 1962